Iker Álvarez de Eulate Molné (born 25 July 2001) is an Andorran footballer who plays as a goalkeeper for Villarreal B and the Andorra national team.

Club career
After playing for the C and B teams, Álvarez had his first call up for Villarreal CF ahead of their UEFA Europa League last 16 second leg at home to FC Dynamo Kyiv on 18 March 2021. He remained on the bench as second-choice Sergio Asenjo played in the 2–0 (4–0 aggregate) victory.

International career
Álvarez made his international debut for Andorra on 28 March 2021 in a 2022 FIFA World Cup qualification match against Poland, losing 3–0 in Warsaw.

Personal life
Iker is the son of former footballer Koldo Álvarez, who was capped for the Andorra national team and later appointed as the team's manager.

Career statistics

International career

Honours
Villarreal
UEFA Europa League: 2020–21

References

External links
 
 
 
 
 
 

2001 births
Living people
People from Andorra la Vella
Andorran people of Spanish descent
People of Basque descent
Andorran footballers
Andorra youth international footballers
Andorra under-21 international footballers
Andorra international footballers
Andorran expatriate footballers
Andorran expatriate sportspeople in Spain
Expatriate footballers in Spain
Association football goalkeepers
Primera Federación players
Segunda División B players
Tercera División players
Villarreal CF C players
Villarreal CF B players